SM U-132 was a German Type U 127 submarine or U-boat in the German Imperial Navy during World War I. The U-boat was ordered on 27 May 1916 and laid down sometime after that. At the end of World War I, the submarine was only 80 to 90% complete; had she been completed and commissioned into the German Imperial Navy she would have been known as SM U-132. U-132 was broken up in place between 1919 and 1920.

Notes

References

Bibliography 

 
 

Type U 127 submarines
World War I submarines of Germany
Ships built in Bremen (state)